Anaicut or Anaikattu  is a very small village  panchayat 
and taluk in Vellore district, Tamil Nadu, India. It is located 20 km from Vellore city limit. The nearest large town is Pallikonda. Anaicut (state assembly constituency) elects members for the Tamil Nadu Assembly.

References

Cities and towns in Vellore district